Joseph Salamé (25 December 1914 – 29 March 2004) was a Lebanese apostolic administrator of the Maronite Catholic Eparchy of Latakia and Archeparch of the Maronite Catholic Archeparchy of Aleppo.

Life
Salamé was born on 25 December 1914 in Antelias, Lebanon, the son of Baz Salamé and Jamilé Salamé. He was ordained as a priest on 10 March 1940. On 15 March 1967 he was appointed Archbishop of the Maronite Catholic Archeparchy of Aleppo and his consecration took place on 14 May 1967 by the hands of the Maronite Catholic Patriarch of Antioch, Paul Peter Meouchi, and his co-consecrators were Elie Farah, Archbishop of the Maronite Catholic Archeparchy of Cyprus and Joseph Khoury, Archbishop of the Maronite Catholic Archeparchy of Tyre. From 24 September 1967 to 4 August 1977 Salamé was also the apostolic administrator of the Laodicea of the Maronites.

On 9 June 1990, in connection with retirement, Salamé resigned from the government of the Maronite Catholic Archeparchy of Aleppo and was succeeded by Pierre Calaos.

On 29 March 2004, Joseph Salamé died at the age of 89.

References

External links
 http://www.catholic-hierarchy.org/bishop/bsalame.html

1914 births
2004 deaths
Maronite Catholic archbishops
Lebanese Maronites
20th-century Maronite Catholic bishops